Susie Gilbert (born 21 February 1989) is an English international field hockey player who played as a midfielder for England and Great Britain.

She plays club hockey in the Investec Women's Hockey League Premier Division for Surbiton.

She competed for England in the women's hockey tournament at the 2014 Commonwealth Games where she won a silver medal. She was educated at Repton School and graduated from Birmingham University in Geography in 2012.

References

External links

1989 births
Living people
Commonwealth Games silver medallists for England
Commonwealth Games bronze medallists for England
English female field hockey players
Field hockey players at the 2010 Commonwealth Games
Field hockey players at the 2014 Commonwealth Games
Alumni of the University of Birmingham
Commonwealth Games medallists in field hockey
Surbiton Hockey Club players
Reading Hockey Club players
Women's England Hockey League players
University of Birmingham Hockey Club players
HC Rotterdam players
Medallists at the 2010 Commonwealth Games
Medallists at the 2014 Commonwealth Games